Ernest W. Maglischo was a swimming coach for 38 years, working at four universities and two swim clubs. He has won 13 NCAA national championships at the Division II level and 19 conference championships. In 1996 he was honored as the Pacific-10 Conference Swimming Coach of the Year, and he has been named NCAA's Division II coach of the year an unprecedented eight times. He has also received the highest coaching award, the National Collegiate and Scholastic Swimming Trophy.

Maglischo holds a PhD in exercise physiology from the Ohio State University. He's a member of the College Swimming Coaches Association, the American Swimming Coaches Association, and U.S.A. Swimming, where he serves on the Sports Medicine Committee. Now retired, Maglischo lives in Phoenix, Arizona.

Maglischo's book "Swimming Even Faster" was released in 1993, the comprehensive swimming book got updated in 2003 when "Swimming Fastest" was released.

References 

Year of birth missing (living people)
Swimming coaches
Living people